Zumbrota is a city in Goodhue County, Minnesota, United States, along the North Fork of the Zumbro River. The population was 3,252 at the 2010 census. It promotes itself as "the only Zumbrota in the world."

History
Zumbrota was claimed as a town in 1856 by Joseph Bailey and D.B. Goddard. The name Zumbrota appears to have resulted from a corruption of the French name for the local Zumbro River, Rivière des Embarras (Obstruction River), coupled with the Dakota toŋ (village).

Zumbrota is home to the Zumbrota Covered Bridge, the last functioning covered bridge in the state of Minnesota. It was originally installed in 1869, one year before the arrival of railroads to the area. The bridge is listed on the National Register of Historic Places.

The Zumbrota Public Library was the first tax-supported library in Minnesota.

The city of Zumbrota celebrated its sesquicentennial in 2006.

Geography

U.S. Route 52 and Minnesota State Highways 58 and 60 are the three main highways in the city.

Climate

Demographics

2010
As of the 2010 Census, there were 3,252 people, 1,349 households, and 882 families living in the city. The racial makeup of the city was 95.8% White, 0.7% African American, 0.5% Native American, 0.7% Asian, 0.6% from other races, and 1.7% from two or more races. Hispanic or Latino of any race were 1.6% of the population.

There were 1,349 households, of which 34.4% had children under the age of 18 living with them, 51.4% were married couples living together, 9.8% had a female householder with no husband present, 4.2% had a male householder with no wife present, and 34.6% were non-families. 30.5% of all households were made up of individuals, and 14.7% had someone living alone who was 65 years of age or older. The average household size was 2.37 and the average family size was 2.96.

The median age in the city was 38.2 years. 26.7% of residents were under the age of 18; 5.5% were between the ages of 18 and 24; 26.3% were from 25 to 44; 25.7% were from 45 to 64; and 16% were 65 years of age or older. The gender makeup of the city was 46.8% male and 53.2% female.

2000
At the 2000 Census, there were 2,789 people, 1,141 households, and 741 families living in the city. The racial makeup of the city was 96.38% White, 0.82% African American, 0.14% Native American, 0.65% Asian, 0.04% Pacific Islander, 1.18% from other races, and 0.79% from two or more races. Hispanic or Latino of any race were 1.47% of the population.

There were 1,141 households, out of which 32.9% had children under the age of 18 living with them, 54.4% were married couples living together, 7.9% had a female householder with no husband present, and 35.0% were non-families. 31.5% of all households were made up of individuals, and 16.1% had someone living alone who was 65 years of age or older. The average household size was 2.40 and the average family size was 3.04.

In the city, the population was spread out, with 26.6% under the age of 18, 7.2% from 18 to 24, 29.4% from 25 to 44, 18.5% from 45 to 64, and 18.3% who were 65 years of age or older. The median age was 37 years. For every 100 females, there were 88.4 males. For every 100 females age 18 and over, there were 85.8 males.

The median income for a household in the city was $41,678, and the median income for a family was $53,750. Males had a median income of $34,821 versus $25,647 for females. The per capita income for the city was $22,786. About 6.6% of families and 8.0% of the population were below the poverty line, including 10.7% of those under age 18 and 13.1% of those age 65 or over.

Religion

Christ Lutheran Church is a member of the Wisconsin Evangelical Lutheran Synod (WELS) in Zumbrota. United Redeemer Lutheran Church and Land's Lutheran Church are member churches of the Evangelical Lutheran Church in America (ELCA) in Zumbrota.

St. Paul's Catholic Church and First Congregational United Church of Christ, a member of the United Church of Christ (UCC), are also in Zumbrota.

Education

Zumbrota-Mazeppa High School was established when the Zumbrota Public Schools and the Mazeppa Public Schools merged in 1987. The primary, middle, and high schools are all in Zumbrota while the elementary school is in Mazeppa.

Christ Lutheran School is a Christian elementary school (Pre-K-8) of the Wisconsin Evangelical Lutheran Synod (WELS) in Zumbrota.

Parks and recreation

Zumbrota's Covered Bridge Park features ball parks, bike trails, a swimming pool, a large kids play structure, camping, and the only authentic covered bridge in Minnesota. Zumbrota's Covered Bridge Park also features a frisbee golf course, a skate park, and an ice rink during the winter months.

Festivals
The Covered Bridge festival is an annual community wide festival held on the third weekend in June. It includes a grand parade, a fireworks festival, 5K/10K fun run and half marathon, and many more activities.

Notable people
 Charles Clarence Beck, chief artist of the DC Comics book superhero Captain Marvel
 Paul Casey “Gus” Bradley, football coach for the NFL
 Kenneth O. Chilstrom, United States Air Force officer
 William Bruce Dickey, businessman and Minnesota state legislator
 Oliver J. Lee, businessman, educator, and Minnesota state legislator
 Genevieve Stearns, nutrition researcher

References

Further reading

External links
City website
News Record - Zumbrota Newspaper
Historic State Theatre
Zumbrota Area Historical Society

Cities in Minnesota
Cities in Goodhue County, Minnesota
Zumbro River
Populated places established in 1856
1856 establishments in Minnesota Territory